Hannah's Hill also known as Irish Hill is a mountain in the Central New York region of New York by Cooperstown. It is named after Hannah Cooper who died at age 23 after a fall from a horse. Moe Pond is located northwest of Hannah's Hill.

References

Mountains of Otsego County, New York
Mountains of New York (state)